Emilie Kiep-Altenloh (1888–1985) was a German sociologist and politician.

Life
Kiep-Altenloh's doctorate, published as a book in 1914, was "the first scholarly publication on cinema in Germany".

Kiep-Altenloh was politically active in the German Democratic Party, advocating equality between men and women. The Nazis prohibited her involvement in politics, promoting a turn to biology and zoology in 1934. She joined Jakob Johann von Uexküll's Institut für Umweltforschung, later taking charge of the Institute and its work training guide dogs for the blind. 

From 1961 to 1965 Kiep-Altenloh was a member of the Bundestag.

Works
 Zur Soziologie des Kino: Die Kino-Unternehmung und die Sozialen Schichten Ihrer Besucher, 1914
 (with Ernst Kantorowicz) Leitfaden für Jugendämter und Jugendschöffen in der Jugendgerichtshilfe, 1923

References

1888 births
1985 deaths
German sociologists
German politicians
Film theorists